Ben Rosenthal (March 27, 1898 - March 24, 1953) served in the California State Assembly for the 52nd district from 1935 to 1940 and during World War I he served in the United States Army.

References

External links

United States Army personnel of World War I
Democratic Party members of the California State Assembly
20th-century American politicians
1898 births
1953 deaths
Politicians from Brooklyn